Cornucopiae cucullatum is a species of herb in the family Poaceae (true grasses).

Sources

References 

Flora of Malta
Pooideae